Luís Miguel Assunção Joaquim (born 5 March 1979), known as Alhandra, is a Portuguese retired footballer who played mainly as a left back – he could also appear as a midfielder.

Club career
Alhandra was born in Vila Franca de Xira, Lisbon District. An unsuccessful graduate of Sporting CP's youth academy he started professionally with its farm team, Sporting Clube Lourinhanense. After a brief spell with FC Porto's reserves he lived his most steady period with U.D. Leiria, helping the side to participations in the UEFA Intertoto Cup and being regularly used over the course of six Primeira Liga seasons (a maximum of 30 league games in 2005–06 and a minimum of 16 in 2007–08, with the latter campaign ending in relegation).

On 2 April 2008, Alhandra signed a two-year contract with Enosis Neon Paralimni FC, adding to the massive Portuguese contingent at the Cypriot club. He returned to Portugal after one sole season, joining second level team Gil Vicente F.C. and being released at the end of the campaign.

Subsequently, Alhandra resumed his career in the lower leagues of his country, retiring in 2012 at the age of 33.

External links

1979 births
Living people
People from Vila Franca de Xira
Portuguese footballers
Association football defenders
Association football midfielders
Primeira Liga players
Liga Portugal 2 players
Segunda Divisão players
Sporting CP footballers
F.C. Alverca players
FC Porto B players
Associação Académica de Coimbra – O.A.F. players
U.D. Leiria players
Gil Vicente F.C. players
Eléctrico F.C. players
Cypriot First Division players
Enosis Neon Paralimni FC players
Portugal youth international footballers
Portugal under-21 international footballers
Portuguese expatriate footballers
Expatriate footballers in Cyprus
Portuguese expatriate sportspeople in Cyprus
Sportspeople from Lisbon District